Zheng or zhèng (Hanyu Pinyin) or Cheng (Wade-Giles) is a Chinese surname and also the name of an ancient state in today's Henan province. It is the 7th name on the Hundred Family Surnames poem.

In 2006, Zheng (Cheng/Chang) ranked 21st in China's list of top 100 most common surnames. Zheng (Cheng/Chang) belongs to the second major group of ten surnames which makes up more than 10% of the Chinese population. Zheng (Cheng/Chang) was a major surname of the rich and powerful during China's Tang dynasty.

In Hong Kong and Taiwan, the name is normally romanized as Cheng or Tcheng (occasionally romanized as Chang in Hong Kong although that variant is more commonly used for another Chinese name, Zhang). In Malaysia, Cheng is commonly romanized as Cheng, Cheang, Chang, Tay, Tee and Teh. It is spelled as Tay in Singapore and The in Indonesia and Ty in Philippines, from the Hakka, Hokkien and Teochew pronunciation of the character. It is also romanized as Dang from Hokchew.

The surname also has taken form outside of Chinese societies: in Korean, the name is written 정 and transliterated as Chung, Jung, or Jeong. In Vietnamese as Trịnh. It is the fifth most common Korean surname (after Kim, Lee, Park, and Choi), with about 4.85% of the South Korean population (2,230,611 people) having this name.

Origin 
The Zheng surname originated in Henan. In 806 BC, King Xuan, the penultimate king of the Western Zhou dynasty, enfeoffed his younger brother Prince You, who became posthumously known as Duke Huan of Zheng, at Zheng (present-day Hua County, Shaanxi).  Duke Huan was killed along with King You of Zhou when the Quanrong tribes sacked the Zhou capital Haojing in 771 BC.  Duke Huan was succeeded by his son Duke Wu, who helped King Ping of Zhou establish the Eastern Zhou dynasty in Luoyang, and his feudal state of Zheng was also moved east to present-day Henan. His descendants and many people of the state later adopted Zheng as their surname.

The city of Xingyang is considered as the origin place of the people whose surname is Zheng. Today, Xingyang is under the administration of the prefecture-level city of Zhengzhou (鄭州) which translates to "Settlement of Zheng". Zhengzhou is the capital of Henan province and is located within the boundaries of the ancient state of Zheng (state). There is also another city called Xinzheng ("New Zheng"), also under the administration of Zhengzhou.

The Zheng clan character (鄭) is featured prominently on the flag of the short-lived rebel Kingdom of Tungning founded by Ming-loyalist Koxinga (who had the surname Zheng) in Taiwan.  Also called the Kingdom of Formosa.  

During the Tang dynasty the Li family of Zhaojun 趙郡李氏, the Cui family of Boling 博陵崔氏, the Cui family of Qinghe 清河崔氏, the Lu family of Fanyang 范陽盧氏, the Zheng family of Xingyang 荥陽鄭氏, the Wang family of Taiyuan 太原王氏, and the Li family of Longxi 隴西李氏 were the seven noble families between whom marriage was banned by law. The marriages between the families were performed clandestinely after the prohibition was implemented on the seven families by Emperor Gaozong. Their status as "Seven Great surnames" became known during Gaozong's rule.

Distribution
Of the top 30 cities in China, 郑 ranked 4th most common surname in the city of Fuzhou.

Spelling and pronunciation

Notable people
There are over 400 Zhengs listed in the Who's Who in Chinese History.

Monarch 
 Zheng Taksin (1737-1768), King of Thonburi Kingdom

Arts, entertainment & media 
 Wah Chang, 鄭華明 (1917-2003), Honolulu-born designer for theatre and science fiction
 Adam Cheng (b. 1947), Hong Kong singer and actor
 Ekin Cheng (b. 1967), Hong Kong singer and actor
 Joe Cheng (b. 1982), Taiwanese actor and model
 Kevin Cheng (b. 1969), Hong Kong actor
 Sammi Cheng (b. 1972), Hong Kong singer and actress
 Tay Ping Hui (b.1970), Singaporean actor
 Sharon Tay, (b. 1966) is a Singaporean American journalist and television host
 The Teng Chun (b. 1902), Indonesian film producer
 Zheng Banqiao (1693–1765), artist and poet, Qing dynasty
 Zheng Guogu (born 1970), artist
 Zheng Shuang (actress, born 1991) (born 1991), Chinese Actress
 Zheng Zhenduo (1898–1958), journalist, modern writer, archeologist and literature scholar

Sports, fitness 
 Cheng Man-ch'ing (1902–75), martial artist, doctor, calligrapher, painter, poet
 Zheng Jie (b. 1983), Chinese tennis player
 Zheng Saisai (b. 1994), Chinese tennis player
 Zheng Siwei (b. 1997), Chinese badminton player
 Zheng Qinwen (b. 2002), Chinese tennis player
 Zheng Yumin (born 1967), Chinese badminton player
 Zheng Zhi (b. 1980), Chinese footballer

Other 
 Zheng Chenggong (1624–62), Ming dynasty military leader who founded the rebellious Kingdom of Tungning (1661-1683) in Taiwan during the Qing dynasty, the reason that the flag of Tungning featured the character 鄭 (Zheng) in its flag; better known in the West as  Koxinga

 Zheng He (1371–1435), Chinese mariner and explorer who was famous for his vast treasure fleet and for reaching East Africa, South Asia, and South East Asia

 Zheng Yi (pirate) (1765–1807), a powerful Chinese pirate operating from Guangdong and throughout the South China Sea in the late 1700s
 Ching Shih (1775–1844), a female Chinese pirate and the widow of Zheng Yi, known for fighting the Qing, British, and Portuguese navies with 300+ junks and 20,000 - 40,000 Chinese pirates
 Cheng Wen-tsan (born 1967), Mayor of Taoyuan City
 Cheng Hsiao-yu (1911-1942), fighter pilot and commander of the Chinese Air Force 4th Pursuit Group during the War of Resistance-World War II 
Zheng Shaoxiong (1997-2021), Chinese student who was murdered in the U.S. 
 Cheng Yu-tung (b. 1925), Hong Kong billionaire
 Chung Keng Quee
 Chung Kok Ming
 Chung On Siew
 Chung Thye Phin
 Chung Thye Yong
 Nien Cheng (b. 1915), author and survivor of seven years of solitary confinement at the hands of the Communist party
 Tcheng Yu-hsiu (1891-1959), the first female lawyer and judge in Chinese history
 Teh Hong Piow (b. 1930), chairman of Public Bank Berhad in Malaysia
 Zheng Tianshou a pirate who pillaged during the Northern Song dynasty

 Alvin Cheng Kam-moon, a Hong Kong student activist
 Carrie Lam née Cheng Yuet-ngor, Hong Kong politician
Claudio Teehankee (1918-1989), Chinese-Filipino judge, later ambassador. He is included here under Cheng, Zheng because in Hokkien, his surname is Tee; similar to Malaysian or Singapore surnames Teh or Tay.
 Tay Yong Kwang, Singaporean judge

See also
 Zheng clan of Xingyang, a prominent clan between the Han and Tang dynasties
 Zheng dynasty, Koxinga's family, which ruled Taiwan during the early Qing dynasty
 Trịnh, Zheng in Vietnamese
 Jeong (surname), Zheng in Korean. Alternatively spelled Chung, Jung, or Jong.

References

External links 
 Categories of Chinese Surnames

Further reading
 Surnames of a Hundred Families (Bai Jia Xing), 960AD-1127AD
 Annal of Surnames by Gao Shilian, 627AD
 Chinese Dimensions: Their Roots, Mindset and Psyche by Dr.Yow Yit Seng, 2006, Malaysia, 1st Edition; 

Chinese-language surnames
Individual Chinese surnames